Homesdale is a 1971 Australian film directed by Peter Weir. Homesdale is a black comedy about visitors at a guest-house acting out their violent private fantasies and games under the control of the house staff.

Plot
Several people gather at the Homesdale Hunting Lodge including butcher/rock singer Mr. Kevin, war veteran Mr. Vaughan, an octogenarian Mr. Levy. All are tormented by Homesdale's staff and forced to participate in a series of games about death and murder in which the true character of the guests starts to emerge.

Cast
Geoff Malone as Mr.Malfry
Grahame Bond as Mr. Kevin
Kate Fitzpatrick as Miss Greenoak
Barry Donnelly as Mr. Vaughan
Doreen Warburton as Mrs. Sharpe
James Lear as Mr.Levy
James Dellit as Manager
Kosta Akon as Chief Robert
Richard Brennan as Robert 1
Peter Weir as Robert 2
Shirley Donald as Matron
Phillip Noyce as Neville

Production
The movie was influenced by horror films such as The Cat and the Canary. The budget was covered by a grant from the Experimental Film and Television Fund. The film was shot at Peter Weir's own home in Sydney in March 1971.

Release
The film premiered at the Sydney Film Festival in June 1971 and won the Grand Prix AFI Award in November. It was screened in universities, schools, film societies and occasionally commercial cinemas, as well as on the Seven network.

References

External links

Homesdale at Oz Movies

1971 films
1970s black comedy films
Australian black comedy films
Films directed by Peter Weir
1971 directorial debut films
1971 comedy films
1971 drama films
1970s English-language films
1970s Australian films